Élie Yaffa (born 9 December 1976), better known under his stage name Booba, is a French rapper. After a brief stint as a break dancer in the early 1990s, Booba partnered with his friend Ali to form Lunatic. The duo released a critically acclaimed album in 2000 but disbanded in 2003. Booba has since embarked on a successful solo career, selling more than 10 million discs over his career and becoming the most legally downloaded artist in French history. Booba is praised for the quality of his flow and beats but often criticized because of the controversial nature of his lyrics. He has also established the rap label Tallac Records, and developed a line of jewellery.

Life and career 
Élie Yaffa was born on 9 December 1976 in the outskirts of Paris in Sèvres. His father is Senegalese and his mother is French of Mosellan and Belgian descent.

With his friend Ali they formed the duo Lunatic in 1994. Unable to secure a record deal from a major label because of their controversial lyrics, they created their own independent record label 45 Scientific in 1999. The following year, Lunatic released its first and only album entitled Mauvais œil.

In 2002, Booba released his debut solo album Temps mort. He followed this up with four further albums: Panthéon, Ouest Side (the most successful), 0.9 and  Lunatic. In late 2012, he released his sixth solo album Futur. In whole, Booba has ten disks certified, six Disques d'Or (Gold album), three Disques de platine (Platinum album) and one Double disque de platine (Double-Platinum album). In 2011, Booba won the "My Youtube" contest, ahead of popular artists like Rihanna, Justin Bieber, Lady Gaga, Eminem, Jay-Z, Sexion D'Assaut, Shakira, Stromae,...

Musical style 
Booba was influenced by the American hip-hop scene of the late 1980s and early 1990s – Mobb Deep, Wu-Tang Clan, 2Pac, and Biggie Smalls. Dark melodies accompanied with raw lyrics, typical of the rap from New York, are present on every album of his. He is often criticized for being an apologist for easy money and murder. Booba advocates a reduction in the taxes and claims himself in support of individual freedom. Racism is a recurring topic of his songs (see for example "Couleur ébène", "Pitbull", "Ma Couleur"), although he sometimes deliberately advocates communitarian positions.

Other ventures 
Booba is also the creator of a streetwear brand, Ünkut, one of the most popular brands of this type in France.

Discography

Studio albums

Mixtapes

Singles

As lead artist 

*Did not appear in the official Belgian Ultratop 50 charts, but rather in the bubbling under Ultratip charts.

As featured artist 

*Did not appear in the official Belgian Ultratop 50 charts, but rather in the bubbling under Ultratip charts.

Other charted songs 

*Did not appear in the official Belgian Ultratop 50 charts, but rather in the bubbling under Ultratip charts.

See also 
 French hip hop
 List of French hip hop artists

References

External links 

 

1976 births
Living people
French rappers
French people of Senegalese descent
French people of Belgian descent
French people of German descent
People from Boulogne-Billancourt
French expatriates in the United States
Gangsta rappers
Rappers from Hauts-de-Seine
Because Music artists